The Chitty are a distinctive group of Tamil people found mainly in Malacca and Singapore.

Chitty may also refer to:

People
 Chitty baronets
 Chitty (cricketer) (1800), English cricketer
 Alison Chitty (born 1948), English set and costume designer
 Clayton Chitty (born 1985), Canadian actor and model
 Bob Chitty (1916–1985), Australian footballer
 Dennis Chitty (1912–2010), Canadian zoologist
 Derwas Chitty (1901–1971), English Anglican priest
 Edward Chitty (1804–1863), English reporter, judge, and conchologist
 Eric Chitty (1909–1990), Canadian speedway rider
 Erik Chitty (1907–1977), English film and television actor
 Ernest Chitty (1883–1948), New Zealand Anglican clergyman, tutor and organist
 Gritakumar E. Chitty (born 1939), Sri Lankan sportsperson and lawyer
 Jon Chitty, Royal Air Force officer
 José Antonio de Armas Chitty (1908–1995), Venezuelan historian, poet, chronicler, essayist, biographer and researcher
 Joseph Chitty (1775–1841), English lawyer and legal writer
 Joseph William Chitty (1828–1899), English cricketer, rower, judge and Liberal politician
 Letitia Chitty (1897–1982), English engineer
 Lily Chitty (1893–1979), English archaeologist and independent scholar
 Peter Chitty (1912–1996), Australian footballer
 Stella Chitty (1928–2005), British stage manager
 Thomas Chitty (1802–1878), English lawyer and legal writer
 Wilf Chitty (1912–1997), English footballer

Other
 Chitty Street, a street in the London Borough of Camden
 A small piece of paper, usually a note, contract or voucher

See also
 Chitty Chitty Bang Bang (disambiguation)
 Chetty